London Road (Brighton) railway station is a railway station located in Round Hill, an inner suburb of Brighton in East Sussex.  It is the first intermediate station on the Brighton branch of the East Coastway Line,  down the line from  station. The station is managed by Southern, who operate all services on the line.

History 

London Road station was designed by David Mocatta (the designer of Brighton station) and opened on 1 October 1877, following housing development in the surrounding area. It was originally to be called Ditchling Rise, a more accurate name as London Road is 370m southwest. Until the Kemp Town branch line closed in 1971, trains to Kemp Town diverged from the Brighton – Lewes line here.

The building on platform 2 (Lewes bound) was demolished in the early 1980s. The station had a substantial refurbishment at the end of 2004 with some add-on parts to the original building demolished.

The station has been home to the Brighton Model Railway Club since 1971.

Services 

All services at London Road are operated by Southern using  and  EMUs.

The typical off-peak service in trains per hour is:
 3 tph to 
 2 tph to 
 1 tph to  via 

See also 

 Transport in Brighton
 History of Brighton – with reference to the Second World War section describing the bombing of the London Road railway viaduct.

References

External links 

Brighton Model Railway Club

Railway stations in Brighton and Hove
Former London, Brighton and South Coast Railway stations
Railway stations in Great Britain opened in 1877
Railway stations served by Govia Thameslink Railway
David Mocatta railway stations
DfT Category E stations